András Farkas (born 3 December 1992) is a Hungarian professional footballer who plays for Tiszakécske.

Club statistics

Updated to games played as of 18 November 2014.

References

External links

HLSZ 

1992 births
Living people
People from Kecskemét
Hungarian footballers
Association football defenders
Kecskeméti TE players
Bajai LSE footballers
Ceglédi VSE footballers
Kazincbarcikai SC footballers
Tiszakécske FC footballers
Nemzeti Bajnokság I players
Nemzeti Bajnokság II players
Sportspeople from Bács-Kiskun County